The Battle of Byeokjegwan was a military engagement fought on 27 February 1593, between the armies of the Ming dynasty led by Li Rusong and Japanese forces under Kobayakawa Takakage. It resulted in a Japanese victory and Ming retreat.

Background
After taking Pyeongyang, Li Rusong sent out Li Rubai, Zhang Shijue, and Yang Yuan with 8,000 troops. They retook Gaeseong on 19 February, and then the provinces of Hwanghae, Gyeonggi, and Gangweon.

Next, Li sent out scouting parties toward Hanseong, which Ryu Seong-ryong claimed had only some 10,000 Japanese troops. Yang Yuan, Li Rubai, and Zhang Shijue were given 2,000 men and ordered to take positions north of Hanseong. When reports that the Japanese were pulling out of Hanseong came in, Li himself decided to head out with his vanguard, leaving the artillery behind. He sent Li Ning and Zu Chengxun even further ahead.

Battle
The 3,000-strong advance force led by Zha Dashou, Zu Chengxun, and Go Eonbaek encountered a Japanese force of about 500 led by Jūji Den'emon. The Ming force retreated, luring Jūji into a bombardment and counterattack, killing 100. Jūji's remaining troops retreated and Tachibana Muneshige attacked the Ming right flank with 2,000 troops. After suffering heavy losses due to a lack of cavalry, Tachibana retreated into the hills with 200 soldiers armed with firearms providing cover fire to prevent Ming forces from pursuing.

Reinforcements led by Kobayakawa Takakage arrived at the battle, bringing Japanese forces to 15,000, forcing the Ming scouting party to retreat. At the same time, Li Rusong also arrived with 2,000 troops. Upon being informed of the Japanese presence by retreating soldiers, Li decided to take only half his men and charge ahead. Li Rusong's 1,000 cavalry encountered 3,000 troops under Awaya Kagenao occupying the hills around Byeokjegwan and fired on them with rockets. Awaya responded with matchlock fire but was unable to stop the rapid cavalry advance and was forced to retreat. However this led Li into a bowl-shaped area where Inoue Kagesada brought 3,000 troops to attack his left flank and Awaya his front.

Meanwhile, 5,000 Japanese troops attacked the retreating Ming forces led by Zha Dashou. Inoue and Awaya's men were relieved of their positions by Kobayakawa and Tachibana, while they marched north to encircle the Ming forces. Seeing that the situation was lost, Li gave the orders to retreat. Yang Yuan joined the battle with the 1,000 cavalry Li had left behind, catching the Japanese in a pincer attack, allowing Li to retreat.

Li Rusong's horse was shot out from under him and was almost killed, however, Li Yousheng used his body as a shield to cover him. Li Rusong's brother, Li Rumei, then shot out the assailant's horse from under him.

The battle lasted from late morning until noon. Finally Li Rusong was forced to retreat in the face of superior numbers.

Aftermath
The Japanese burned all the grass within the vicinity of Hanseong to deprive the Ming cavalry of fodder. According to Samuel Hawley, this led to the death of some 10,000 horses within a few days, but this number is disputed and possibly accounts for all horse casualties in the entire war. 

After the failure at Byeokjegwan, some Koreans called for the replacement of Li Rusong with Luo Shangzhi. Li also came under fire from his own subordinates. Wang Bidi accused him of denying his men adequate food and drink, directing battles from the rear, and refusing to give out the money or titles he had promised to those who first ascended the walls of Pyeongyang. Li deflected the blame towards Song Yingchang, a civil official.

According to Japanese sources such as the Chōsen seibatsuki and Chōsen gunki monogatari series (tales from the Joseon war) published during the mid-17th century or later, 6,000 or 10,000 Ming Chinese soldiers were killed while the Japanese suffered only a few hundred casualties. There is reason to suspect that these reports may be faulty. A tally of Japanese forces on 23 March 1593, counted only 1,132 men among the forces of Tachibana Muneshige and Takahashi Munemasu, a decrease of 1,800 from their strength prior to their participation in the battle. Tachibana's forces did not participate in another battle for the rest of the campaign. According to Li Rusong, of the Ming forces, 264 soldiers were killed, 49 were wounded, and 276 horses were killed. Another Ming general, Wu Weishan, said the Japanese lost 120 while the Ming forces suffered 1,500 casualties. Yun Geun-su, an official of Joseon, stated that both Japanese and Chinese forces suffered 300 casualties. Another Joseon official, Yi Deokhyeong, said the Japanese suffered 500 to 600 casualties.

Citations

Bibliography

 
 
 
 
 
 
 
 
 
 
 桑田忠親 [Kuwata, Tadachika], ed., 舊參謀本部編纂, [Kyu Sanbo Honbu], 朝鮮の役 [Chousen no Eki]　(日本の戰史 [Nihon no Senshi] Vol. 5), 1965.
 
 
 
 
 
 
 
 
 
 
 
 
  
 
 
 
 
 
 

Byeokjegwan
1593 in Asia